Wait 'til You're Older is a 2005 Hong Kong fantasy comedy-drama film produced and directed by Teddy Chan and starring Andy Lau.

Plot

Chan Chi-kwong (Howard Sit) is a young boy who lives with his father (Felix Wong) and stepmother (Karen Mok). He blames his stepmother for the suicide of his mother 3 years earlier and continually runs away from home. One day, while walking to school, he meets an eccentric old man (Feng Xiaogang) in the park who accidentally pours a magic potion he has created down a drain. The next day, a huge tree has grown from a seedling in the drain. Kwong goes to the man's house and steals the potion, falling and breaking it as he tries to run away. Some of the potion enters a cut in his hand, and the next day he wakes up to find he has grown to the age of 20 overnight. Kwong (Andy Lau) is thrilled that he has become an adult and is able to finally run away from home without being recognized. As he gets older each day, he learns more about being an adult and about the situations of those around him.

Cast
 Andy Lau as Chan Chi-kwong
 Karen Mok as Tsui Mun
 Felix Wong as Chan Man
 Cherrie Ying as Miss Lee
 Gordon Lam as Vice Principal as Chow 
 Howard Sit as Young Chan Chi-kwong
 Chim Pui-ho as Bear
 Jacky Wong as Billy
 Feng Xiaogang as Bum, the drifter (special appearance)
 Li Bingbing as Kwong's mum (guest appearance)
 Chapman To as Policeman (guest appearance)
 Kristal Tin as Policewoman (guest appearance)
 Nicola Cheung as Miss Wong (guest appearance)
 Simon So as Jack, the basketball team captain
 Joe Cheung as Joe
 Lee Yee-man as Beer lady

Awards and nominations

See also
 Big, a 1988 fantasy-comedy film about a boy who makes a wish "to be big".

References

External links

2005 films
Hong Kong fantasy comedy-drama films
2000s fantasy comedy-drama films
2000s Cantonese-language films
Media Asia films
Films directed by Teddy Chan
Films about dysfunctional families
Films set in Hong Kong
Films shot in Hong Kong
Films with screenplays by Susan Chan
2000s Hong Kong films